The Yūbari-class destroyer escort (or frigate) of the Japanese Maritime Self-Defense Force is the successor of the Ishikari-class destroyer escort. Yubari was named after the experimental light cruiser of the 1920s–1930s, which served in (and was lost during) World War II.

Description
This class was the extended version of its predecessor, . The displacement was slightly increased, and some improvements were introduced. But they were almost same and there were many points in common as follows:
 The CODOG propulsion system.
 The propulsion system of this class was identical with the one of its predecessor. The Rolls-Royce Olympus TM-3B manufactured by the Kawasaki Heavy Industries under license was used for boosting. The cruising engine is the Kawasaki 6DRV 35/44 diesel engine developed by the Technical Research and Development Institute (TRDI).
 Centre-superstructure style.
 Whereas the JMSDF incline to adopt the flush decker style, in this class, the superstructure is at the center of the ship to save the space of the ship. This was very controversial decision, and because of this decision, there has been the criticism about the oceangoing capability of this class.
 Simplified but sufficient C4ISR system.
 This class was not equipped with air-search radar whereas her predecessors almost had. Alternatively there were the OPS-28 surface search and target acquisition radar which can deal with low-altitude aircraft and missiles. And also the FCS-2 gun fire-control system has the air-searching capability. As the tactical data processing system, they had the OYQ-5 being capable of receiving data automatically from other ships via Link-14 (STANAG 5514; the data link with the Radioteletype).
 Brand-new weapon systems.
 This class was equipped with eight Boeing Harpoon Surface-to-surface missile as the key weapon system whereas traditional Japanese frigates weighed heavily on the Anti-submarine warfare. According to this mission concept, its predecessor's Mark 16 GMLS for the ASROC system was removed. And a modern Otobreda 76 mm gun replaced its predecessor's older 3-inch gun and automation greatly reduced the number of crew needed. Provision for a Phalanx CIWS was made in the stern area, although it was never installed.

Both ships of this class were deployed at the Ominato District Force (home-ported at Mutsu, Aomori). The Ominato District is the northernmost district of the JMSDF and forefront against the Russian Pacific Fleet. Originally it had been planned to build six of this class (1985 Mid-Term Defense Buildup Program).

Ships in the class

See also
 List of frigates

Notes

References
 
 Jane's Fighting Ships 2005–2006

 
Frigates of the Japan Maritime Self-Defense Force
Frigate classes